Afrasura clara is a moth of the  subfamily Arctiinae. It is found in western Africa.

References

clara
Fauna of Gabon
Moths of Africa
Moths described in 1893